The Ollie & Moon Show (also known as Ollie & Moon) is an animated children's television series developed by Diane Kredensor and Robert Vargas. It is based on the Ollie & Moon book series by Diane Kredensor. The series debuted on Sprout in the United States on May 27, 2017, and was carried over when the channel became Universal Kids months later until 2021. The show is also available on Netflix and HBO Max. The series was picked up from a pilot project contest on BiteTV. Season two, as of 2018, is in production and aired on France TV.

Plot
The Ollie & Moon Show is about two six-year-old cats Ollie and Moon, along with their travel buddy Stanley the snail, who travel around the world and learn about different cultures. The show features animated characters in realistic backgrounds.

Characters
 Ollie is a methodical orange cat who loves to plan. Voiced by Kobi Frumer and Brian Beckerle in season 1 and Liam Patenaude in season 2
 Moon is an impulsive cream cat who loves to adventure. Voiced by Mattea Conforti in season 1 and Rosalie Turmel in season 2
 Stanley is a blue and purple snail, and Ollie and Moon's travel companion. Voiced by Ofosu Jones-Quartey (Ian Jones-Quartey's older brother) in season 1 and Don Shepherd in season 2.

Episodes

Pilot (2012)

Season 1 (2017–18)

Season 2 (2020–present)
Manhattan Lemonade Showdown
Camping With Catlock in Canada
Venice Show Stopper
Egyptian History Mystery
Game Time in Tokyo
Pet Sitting in Paris
Germany Takes the Cake
Fearless in Fiji
Cool Cats in China
Ollie's Mongolian Move
The Spanish Giant
Moon's Moroccan Hat Dance
Rip Snorter in Australia
Rockin' Cats in Finland
Bendier in India
Amazon River Adventure
The Korean Cracker Challenge
Japanese Bunny Bop
Talent Trouble in London
Guatemalan Kite Contest
Makeover in Milan
Friendship Day In Switzerland
Lotta Likes South Africa
Treasure Hunt in Jordan
Super Ollie in Nicaragua
Picky Parrots in Poland
Moonzan of the Jungle

Broadcast
The Ollie & Moon Show debuted on Universal Kids (as Sprout) in the United States on May 27, 2017. The series aired on Knowledge Network and TVOKids in Canada. In Latin America, it airs on Discovery Kids, and in Quebec it airs on TFO. In the UK, the series aired on Tiny Pop The series is also available for streaming Netflix and HBO Max in the United States. Season 2 was released on HBO Max in 2021 instead of being aired on Universal Kids. The series was removed from HBO Max in August 2022.

References

External links

2010s American animated television series
2020s American animated television series
2017 American television series debuts
2010s Canadian animated television series
2020s Canadian animated television series
2017 Canadian television series debuts
2010s French animated television series
2020s French animated television series
2017 French television series debuts
2010s preschool education television series
2020s preschool education television series
American children's animated comedy television series
American children's animated fantasy television series
American flash animated television series
American preschool education television series
American television shows based on children's books
Animated preschool education television series
Canadian children's animated comedy television series
Canadian children's animated fantasy television series
Canadian flash animated television series
Canadian preschool education television series
Canadian television shows based on children's books
English-language television shows
French children's animated comedy television series
French children's animated fantasy television series
French flash animated television series
French-language television shows
French preschool education television series
French television shows based on children's books
Animated television series about cats
Animated television series about children
Universal Kids original programming